Mark Armstrong may refer to:

Mark Armstrong (astronomer) (born 1958), British amateur astronomer
Mark Armstrong (economist) (born 1964), British economist and academic
Mark Armstrong (equestrian) (born 1961), British international representative show-jumper
Mark Armstrong (footballer), New Zealand international association football player
Mark Armstrong (musician), British jazz musician and composer
Mark Armstrong, television executive, chair of the Australian Broadcasting Corporation Board in the 1990s
Mark Armstrong, writer, co-creator of Spider-Ham